Forsterygion gymnotum, known commonly as the Tasmanian robust triplefin, is a species of triplefin blenny in the genus Forsterygion. It is native to coastal New Zealand, but has also been Introduced to Tasmania, Australia. It was described by Eric Oswald Scott in 1977 from Tasmania. It is thought to have reached Tasmania from New Zealand through shipments of osyters.

References

Tasmanian robust triplefin
Fish described in 1977
Taxobox binomials not recognized by IUCN